Live at Budokan is a live album released by American crossover thrash band Stormtroopers of Death. The album is a recording of a one-off re-union gig put on by the band, and includes the majority of the longer tracks from their first album and some previously unheard tracks, as well as covers of the bands M.O.D., Ministry, Nirvana, and Fear. Although its title refers to Budokan, the famous Japanese concert hall, this album was actually recorded in New York City, the title is a play on Cheap Trick's seminal At Budokan live album from 1978.  The concert happened at New York City venue The Ritz, where S.O.D. appeared alongside Agnostic Front and Morbid Angel.

The Japanese version of the album contains three additional tracks; "The Ballad of Jim Morrison", "The Ballad of Freddie Mercury" and "United and Strong".

Track listing
"Intro" – 0:36
"March of the SOD" – 2:02
"Sargent D and the SOD" – 2:47
"Kill Yourself" – 2:55
"Momo" – 0:43
"Pi Alpha Nu" – 2:58
"Milano Mosh" – 1:42
"Speak English or Die" – 3:37
"Chromatic Death" – 1:04
"Fist Banging Mania" – 2:32
"The Camel Boy" – 0:23
"No Turning Back" – 0:51
"Milk" – 2:07
"Vitality" – 1:23
"Fuck the Middle East" – 0:54
"Douche Crew" – 2:04
"Get a Real Job" – 2:44 (M.O.D.)
"The Ballad of Jimi Hendrix" – 0:34
"Livin' in the City" (Fear) – 2:08
"Pussy Whipped" – 3:29
"Stigmata" (Jourgensen) – 2:53
"Thieves" (Ministry) – 1:45
"Freddy Krueger" – 3:04
"Territorial Pissings" (Cobain) – 2:46
"United Forces" – 3:20

Credits
Billy Milano – vocals
Scott Ian – guitars, backing vocals, vocals on "Thieves", drums on "Territorial Pissings" and "United Forces"
Dan Lilker – bass, backing vocals
Charlie Benante – drums, guitar on "Territorial Pissings" and "United Forces"

References

Stormtroopers of Death albums
Albums produced by Alex Perialas
1992 live albums
Megaforce Records live albums
Albums recorded at the Nippon Budokan

it:Bigger than the Devil